Dakshin Rampur is a census town in the Kumargram CD block in the Alipurduar subdivision of the Alipurduar district  in the state of West Bengal, India.

Geography

Location

Area overview
Alipurduar district is covered by two maps. It is an extensive area in the eastern end of the Dooars in West Bengal. It is undulating country, largely forested, with numerous rivers flowing down from the outer ranges of the Himalayas in Bhutan. It is a predominantly rural area with 79.38% of the population living in the rural areas. The district has 1 municipal town and 20 census towns and that means that 20.62% of the population lives in the urban areas. The scheduled castes and scheduled tribes, taken together, form more than half the population in all the six community development blocks in the district. There is a high concentration of tribal people (scheduled tribes) in the three northern blocks of the district.

Note: The map alongside presents some of the notable locations in the subdivision. All places marked in the map are linked in the larger full screen map.

Demographics
As per the 2011 Census of India, Dakshin Rampur had a total population of 6,932.  There were 3,298 (52%) males and 3,094 (48%) females. There were 627 persons in the age range of 0 to 6 years. The total number of literate people in Dakshin Rampur was 5,124 (88.88% of the population over 6 years).

Infrastructure
According to the District Census Handbook 2011, Jalpaiguri, Dakhin Rampur covered an area of 3.4884 km2. Among the civic amenities, the protected water supply involved overhead tank, tap water from treated source and uncovered well. It had 948 domestic electric connections. Among the medical facilities the nearest maternity/ child welfare centre was 10 km away, the nearest hospital 35 km away. Among the educational facilities it had 3 primary schools, 1 middle school, 1 secondary school,1 senior secondary school, the nearest general degree college at Uttar Kamakhyaguri 8 km away.

Education
Saheed Kshudiram College was established at Kamakhyaguri in 1996. Affiliated with the University of North Bengal, it offers courses in arts and science.

Healthcare
Kamakhyaguri Rural Hospital, with 30 beds at Kamakhyaguri, is the major government medical facility in the Kumargram CD block.

References

Cities and towns in Alipurduar district